Mario Rafael Rodríguez Rodríguez (born September 14, 1981 in Guatemala City, Guatemala) is a retired Guatemalan football midfielder. He has  played for local club Municipal.

Rodríguez has played locally also played for Comunicaciones and in Major League Soccer for Columbus Crew. He was also a member of the Guatemala national team.

Club career
Rodríguez, nicknamed El Loco (Spanish for The Crazy Man), started his career in Guatemala in 2002 with Comunicaciones, where he would remain until 2004. In February 2004 during the 211th clasico between longtime arch-rivals  Municipal and Comunicaciones, he collided with goalkeeper Danny Ortiz causing Ortiz to suffer a torn pericardium. Ortiz was taken to the Hospital Centro Médico where he died two hours later.

In 2005, he joined Columbus Crew from Costa Rican side Alajuelense, and in 2006, he played for Miami FC, and with 7 goals and 4 assists he was second in scoring for the club behind Brazilian forward Romário. He returned to Guatemala to play for Municipal for the 2007 Clausura.

He has been productive for Municipal. But despite being the top scorer on the team since joining, he hasn't always had the best relationship with Municipal fans because of his past with rivals Comunicaciones.

In March 2009, Rodríguez almost signed with Chunnam Dragons from the Korean League, only for the deal to fail through at the second attempt.

International career
Rodríguez made his international debut in a January 2003 friendly match against El Salvador and has since been capped over 70 times for his country. He represented his country in 19 FIFA World Cup qualification matches as well as at the 2003 and 2007 CONCACAF Gold Cups.

In 2006, Rodríguez was recalled by Guatemala national coach Hernán Darío Gómez to play against Haiti. He scored a goal and then was recalled for a friendly in Guatemala City against Panama.
He made his return to the national squad for the 2014 World Cup qualifying campaign, scoring three goals in the first two matches, against Saint Vincent and the Grenadines.

International goals
Scores and results list. Guatemala's goal tally first.

Honours
Comunicaciones 
Liga Nacional de Guatemala: Clausura 2003

Municipal 
Liga Nacional de Guatemala: Clausura 2005, Apertura 2005, Clausura 2006, Apertura 2006, Clausura 2008, Clausura 2010, Apertura 2011

External links
 Player profile - CSD Municipal

References

1981 births
Living people
Sportspeople from Guatemala City
Guatemalan footballers
Guatemalan expatriate footballers
Guatemala international footballers
2003 UNCAF Nations Cup players
2003 CONCACAF Gold Cup players
2007 CONCACAF Gold Cup players
Comunicaciones F.C. players
L.D. Alajuelense footballers
C.S.D. Municipal players
Columbus Crew players
Miami FC (2006) players
Major League Soccer players
USL First Division players
Liga FPD players
Expatriate footballers in Costa Rica
Expatriate soccer players in the United States
Association football wingers